This is a list of the number-one albums of the Specialist Classical Albums Chart during the 2010s.

Number ones

By artist

, Twenty five artists have spent six or more weeks at the top of the Specialist Classical Albums Chart so far during the 2010s. The totals below include only credited performances.

By record label
, 35 record labels have released chart-topping albums so far during the 2010s.

See also

List of UK Albums Chart number ones of the 2010s

References

External links
Specialist Classical Albums Top 20 at the Official Charts Company

2010s in British music
Specialist Classical Albums
Specialist Classical
2010s-related lists